The James River Bridge carries Interstate 95 across the James River in Richmond, Virginia.

History 

The original 6 lane structure was built in 1957 and 1958 as part of the Richmond-Petersburg Turnpike and was financed with toll revenue bonds issued by the Richmond-Petersburg Turnpike Authority, a political subdivision of the Commonwealth of Virginia.

In 1975, the Virginia Department of Transportation (VDOT) assumed the operations of former Turnpike Authority. Although the initial bonds were retired in 1975, additional tolls were collected to finance improvements along other sections of the former Turnpike. Tolls for the bridge and I-95 were finally completely removed in 1992.

Beginning in 1976, a complicated connection with the Downtown Expressway—a newer toll road built by the Richmond Metropolitan Authority (RMA)—was constructed on the bridge itself.

The bridge was re-decked by VDOT from 1999 to August 2002.

Flooding 
The bridge is high above the river, and is not considered in danger of flooding during periods when the river periodically floods. However, in the past the southern approach has been subject to closure due to flooding of the James River, notably after Hurricane Camille in 1969, Hurricane Agnes in 1972, and Hurricane Gloria in 1985.

Richmond's Flood Wall, designed to prevent a 280-year flood, completed in 1995 at a cost of about $142 million, is hoped to prevent such future closures.

References

External links 

 DHRM WebCAM view from the 13th Floor of the State of Virginia's Monroe Building pointed Southward showing I-95 & James River Bridge in Richmond, Va.

Bridges completed in 1958
Bridges over the James River (Virginia)
Bridges in Richmond, Virginia
Road bridges in Virginia
Interstate 95
Bridges on the Interstate Highway System
Former toll bridges in Virginia